The men's double-mini trampoline competition in trampoline gymnastics at the 2001 World Games took place from 19 to 21 August 2001 at the Akita City Gymnasium in Akita, Japan.

Competition format
A total of 10 athletes entered the competition. Best eight athletes from preliminary round qualifies to the final.

Results

Preliminary

Final

References

External links
 Results on IWGA website

Trampoline gymnastics at the 2001 World Games